Keşlitürkmenli is a village in Silifke district of Mersin Province, Turkey. It is situated in the Taurus Mountains. The population of Keşlitürkmenli was 241 as of 2012. Main economic activity is farming.

References

External links
Image

Villages in Silifke District